Tri Chandra Military Hospital (Nepali त्रिचन्द्र सैनिक अस्पताल, Tri chandra Sainik Aspatal) is an army hospital established in 1925 and run by Nepal Army. It was constructed with the help from the British after First world war. The hospital is located in Tudikhel, Kathmandu. In 1990, services of this hospital were shifted to Shree Birendra Hospital and the hospital was closed for renovation. In August 2018, Tri Chandra hospital was reopened. The fund to renovate the hospital was gathered from army welfare fund

It is under the control of Nepal Army Institute of Health Science(NAIHS).

Facilities
dental service
pharmacy
pediatric
physiotherapy
pathology
radiotherapy

References

External links
NAIHS

Hospitals in Nepal
1925 establishments in Nepal